These are election results in 1901 to the United States House of Representatives:

List of elections 

|-
! 
| Charles A. Boutelle
|  | Republican
| 
|  | Incumbent member-elect resigned during previous congress.New member elected April 8, 1901.Republican hold.
| nowrap | 

|-
! 
| Robert E. Burke
|  | Democratic
| 1896
|  | Incumbent died June 5, 1901.New member elected July 13, 1901.Democratic hold.
| nowrap | 

|-
! 
| Rousseau O. Crump
|  | Republican
| 
|  | Incumbent died May 1, 1901.New member elected October 15, 1901.Republican hold.
| nowrap | 

|-
! 
| Albert D. Shaw
|  | Republican
| 
|  | Incumbent member-elect died during previous congress.New member elected November 5, 1901.Republican hold.
| nowrap | 

|-
! 
| Marriott H. Brosius
|  | Republican
| 
|  | Incumbent died March 16, 1901.New member elected November 5, 1901.Republican hold.
| nowrap | 

|-
! 
| J. William Stokes
|  | Democratic
| 1894
|  | Incumbent died July 6, 1901.New member elected November 5, 1901.Democratic hold.Winner was seated December 2, 1901.Successor also elected the same day to the next term, see below.
| nowrap | 

|}

References

 
1901